Janet Hemingway  (born 1957) is a British infectious diseases specialist. She is the former Director of Liverpool School of Tropical Medicine (LSTM) and founding Director of Infection Innovation Consortium and Professor of Tropical Medicine at LSTM. She is current President of the Royal Society of Tropical Medicine and Hygiene. 

While serving as Director of LSTM between 2001 and 2019, Hemingway oversaw a period of organisational growth. This included the awarding of Higher Education Institution Status & Degree Awarding powers to LSTM.  She was awarded the Commander of the British Empire (CBE) for services to the Control of Tropical Disease Vectors 2012. In 2020, she became the founding Director of iiCON, a collaborative R&D programme that is establishing a leading global centre for infectious disease R&D within the North West of England. 

Hemingway also works on advocacy and resource mobilisation (and was previously chief executive officer) at the Innovative Vector Control Consortium (IVCC) (funded by the Bill and Melinda Gates Foundation), and is International Director of the Joint Centre for Infectious Diseases Research, Jizan, Saudi Arabia.

Early life and education
Hemingway was born in a small mining town in West Yorkshire in 1957 to parents who owned a corner shop. She obtained a first-class honours degree in zoology and genetics from the University of Sheffield, where she set up the university's first mosquito insectary as part of her thesis project. She was invited to pursue a PhD at the London School of Hygiene and Tropical Medicine (LSHTM), and within two years had obtained her doctorate on the biochemistry and genetics of insecticide resistance in Anopheles mosquitoes.

Research and career
Hemingway has over 30 years of experience working on the biochemistry and molecular biology of specific enzyme systems associated with xenobiotic resistance, most notably the malaria-transmitting mosquito.

Hemingway is distinguished as the international authority on insecticide resistance in insect vectors of disease. She was first to report co-amplification of multiple genes on a single amplicon and demonstrate their impact on disease transmission. Her studies on resistance management have transformed the use of insecticide by disease control programmes. Her promotion of evidence-based monitoring and evaluation strategies for insecticide resistance has guided and improved international policy on vector control strategies for Onchocerciasis, Malaria, and other vector borne diseases. Her rigorous scientific approach to resistance analysis has contributed to a greater understanding of resistance, its impact and spread and has minimised its effect in increasing human mortality and morbidity.

Awards and honours
 Awarded Commander of the Order of the British Empire (CBE) for services to the Control of Tropical Disease Vectors in the Queen's 2012 Birthday Honours.
 Elected a Fellow of The Royal Society (FRS) in 2011  
 Elected a Fellow to the American Academy of Microbiology in 2011
 Elected a Foreign Associate to the United States National Academy of Sciences in 2010
 Conferred Honorary Doctor of Science by University of Sheffield in 2009
 Inaugurated as a Fellow of the Royal College of Physicians in 2008
 Inaugurated as a Fellow of the Academy of Medical Sciences (FMedSci) in 2006.

References 

Living people
1957 births
British parasitologists
Fellows of the Royal Society
Malariologists
Female Fellows of the Royal Society
Commanders of the Order of the British Empire
Fellows of the Academy of Medical Sciences (United Kingdom)
Foreign associates of the National Academy of Sciences
Academics of the Liverpool School of Tropical Medicine